Stella Tremblay is a 21st-century American legislator. She represented Rockingham County from Auburn in the New Hampshire House of Representatives.

Tremblay was born in Italy, and is a Mormon. She was first elected to the state legislature in 2010 (representing Rockingham District 3), and reelected in 2012 (representing Rockingham District 4). She resigned from the legislature on June 20, 2013.

Career
She was elected on the New Hampshire Republican Party ticket and served on the Children and Family Law committee.

In 2013 Tremblay co-sponsored legislation maintaining that the District of Columbia Organic Act of 1871 unlawfully abrogated the United States Constitution by removing the Titles of Nobility Amendment, a proposed but unratified amendment which would have prevented people with titles of nobility from holding public office, so that the Constitution as accepted has been fraudulent since then, and seeking to correct this.  This claim is frequently used by members of the alt-right to claim that lawyers, through the use of the title esquire, are barred from holding public office.

Boston Marathon comments
Tremblay has maintained that the 2013 Boston Marathon bombings were a black operation planned and executed by the Federal government of the United States, suggesting as evidence that the injuries sustained by Jeff Bauman (who lost both his legs in the bombing) appear to have been faked. The New Hampshire Republican Party disavowed and strongly condemned her statements.

On June 19, 2013, she circulated a document to the entire legislature reiterating her claim and adding additional evidence.  She resigned the next day.

References

Living people
People from Auburn, New Hampshire
Republican Party members of the New Hampshire House of Representatives
American conspiracy theorists
21st-century American politicians
Year of birth missing (living people)